Vollmann is a surname. Notable people with the surname include:

Korbinian Vollmann (born 1993), German footballer
Peter Vollmann (born 1957), German footballer and manager
William T. Vollmann (born 1959), American writer and journalist

See also
Volkmann